Georgiana is a town in Butler County, Alabama, United States. As of the 2010 census, the population of the town was 1,738.

Geography
Georgiana is located in southern Butler County at 31°38'24.313" North, 86°44'21.991" West (31.640087, -86.739442). Interstate 65 passes to the northwest of the town, with access from exit 114 (State Route 106). U.S. Route 31 (Mobile Road) passes through the east side of the town, leading north  to Greenville, the county seat.

Demographics

2020 census

As of the 2020 United States Census, there were 1,324 people, 524 households, and 319 families residing in the town.

2010 census
As of the census of 2010, there were 738 people, 249 households, and 220 families residing in the town. The racial makeup of the town was 65.4% Black or African American, 33.1% White, 0.3% Native American, and 0.8% from two or more races. 0.3% of the population were Hispanic or Latino of any race.

There were 249 households, out of which 25.9% had children under the age of 18 living with them, 34.1% were married couples living together, 25.0% had a female householder with no husband present, and 35.9% were non-families. 32.7% of all households were made up of individuals, and 16.2% had someone living alone who was 65 years of age or older. The average household size was 2.42 and the average family size was 3.06.

In the town, the age distribution of the population shows 21.3% under the age of 18, 8.2% from 18 to 24, 22.1% from 25 to 44, 24.2% from 45 to 64, and 24.1% who were 65 years of age or older. The median age was 43.3 years. For every 100 females, there were 82.2 males. For every 100 women age 18 and over, there were 88.8 men.

The median income for a household in the town was $38,694, and the median income for a family was $40,139. Males had a median income of $30,625 versus $28,519 for females. The per capita income for the town was $31,181. About 39.4% of families and 13.6% of the population were below the poverty line, including 54.1% of those under age 18 and 32.5% of those age 65 or over.

Notable people
Amasa Coleman Lee, Alabama lawyer and legislator
Tom Morrow, former NFL safety for the Oakland Raiders
Hank Williams, country music legend
William Herbert York, a bass player in Hank Williams' Drifting Cowboys band

See also
SS Georgiana, Confederate cruiser wrecked March 19, 1863, while attempting to run the U.S. Navy's blockade at Charleston, South Carolina

References 

Towns in Alabama
Towns in Butler County, Alabama